Blechschmidt is a surname that was found between 1880 and 1920 in the USA. The name means "tinsmith" in German. Notable people with the surname include:

 Bernd Blechschmidt, East German Nordic combined skier
 Joachim Blechschmidt, German pilot in the Second World War
 Wilhelm Blechschmidt, bobsledder